Eduard Demenkovets (born 1 May 1968) is a retired Belarusian professional footballer and Belarus international. His playing career suffered in late 2000 as a result of car crash he was involved in. He retired after playing several more seasons in lower leagues. Since 2007 he works as a head coach for women's club Gomel-SDYUShOR-8.

In addition to coaching women's team, Demenkovets has played for and coached several futsal clubs (most notably BCh Gomel from 2009 till 2014). He also played for and coached Belarus national beach soccer team.

Honours
Dinamo Minsk
Belarusian Premier League champion: 1993–94, 1994–95
Belarusian Cup winner: 1993–94

Lokomotiv-96 Vitebsk
Belarusian Cup winner: 1997–98

References

External links
 Profile at teams.by
 

1968 births
Living people
Belarusian footballers
Belarus international footballers
Belarusian expatriate footballers
Expatriate men's footballers in Denmark
FC Shakhtyor Soligorsk players
FC Vitebsk players
FC Dinamo Minsk players
FC Rechitsa-2014 players
FC Gomel players
Vejle Boldklub players
FC ZLiN Gomel players
Association football midfielders
FC FShM Torpedo Moscow players